The Road to Here is the second studio album by the American country music group Little Big Town. The album was released on October 4, 2005 on Equity Records and has been certified Platinum by the RIAA. The album was nominated for Best Country Album and "Boondocks" was nominated for Best Country Performance by a Duo or Group with Vocals at the 49th Annual Grammy Awards.

Content
Singles released from the album include "Boondocks", "Bring It On Home", "Good as Gone", and "A Little More You", all of which charted in the Top 20 on the Hot Country Songs charts. "Bring It On Home" was the highest, at number 4, and "Boondocks" reached number 9 in addition to achieving a gold certification as a single. Besides these songs, an acoustic rendition of "Stay", a song from the group's self-titled debut, is included. According to the liner notes, Kimberly Roads was inspired to write "Lost" after her husband died.

Track listing

Personnel
As listed in liner notes.

Little Big Town
Karen Fairchild – vocals
Kimberly Roads – vocals
Philip Sweet – vocals
Jimi Westbrook – vocals

Additional musicians
 Ron Block - banjo (tracks 1, 2, 5, 11), acoustic guitar (tracks 1, 5, 7)
 Mark Childers - bass guitar (tracks 2, 7)
 Jerry Douglas - Dobro (track 2)
 Dan Dugmore - Dobro (tracks 4, 10), steel guitar (tracks 4, 8)
 Gordon Kennedy - electric guitar (tracks 2, 3, 4, 6, 8, 9, 11, 12)
 Wayne Kirkpatrick - acoustic guitar (all tracks except 9), National guitar (tracks 1, 3, 6, 9, 12), octave mandolin (tracks 2, 5), dulcimer (track 3), piano (track 4), banjitar (tracks 6, 9, 12), mando-guitar (track 8), pencil guitar (track 8), Hammond B4 Organ (track 10), programming (track 10), mandolin (tracks 12, 13)
 Chris McHugh - drums (all tracks except 13)
 Jimmie Lee Sloas - bass guitar (all tracks except 2, 7, 9, 13)
 Adam Steffey - mandolin (track 1)
 Jackie Street - bass guitar (track 9)
 Jonathan Yudkin - mandolin (tracks 7, 11), fiddle (track 7), Celtic harp (track 7)

Technical
 Kristin Barlowe - photography
 "JB" - engineering, mixing (track 3 only)
 Wayne Kirkpatrick - producer
 Little Big Town - producer
 Glenn Spinner - engineering
 Aaron Swehart - engineering
 David Zaffiro - mixing (except track 3)

Chart performance

Weekly charts

Year-end charts

Certifications

References

2005 albums
Little Big Town albums
Equity Music Group albums